Ismoil is a jamoat in north-west Tajikistan. It is located in Ghafurov District in Sughd Region. The jamoat has a total population of 19,844 (2015). It consists of 18 villages, including Shamsobod.

References

Populated places in Sughd Region
Jamoats of Tajikistan